D'Agostino, a Sicilian noble lineage originated at least in the thirteenth century  

D'Agostino may also refer to:
 D'Agostino (surname), an Italian surname
 D'Agostino's K-squared test, a goodness-of-fit measure in statistics
 D'Agostino Supermarkets, a supermarket chain in the New York City area

See also
 Agostino (disambiguation)
 De Agostini (disambiguation)